Kermia tessellata is a species of sea snail, a marine gastropod mollusk in the family Raphitomidae.

Description
The shell grows to a length of  10 mm

The whorls are granular, decussated with longitudinal and spiral lines. They are painted with brown somewhat square spots.

Distribution
This species occurs in the Indian Ocean off Madagascar and Mauritius, and in the Pacific Ocean off Taiwan, New Caledonia and Northeast Australia.

References

 Montrouzier, R.P. in Souverbie, M. 1861. Descriptions d'espèces nouvelles de l'archipel Caledonien, (6th article). Journal de Conchyliologie 9: 271-284 
 Sowerby, G.B. (3rd) 1893. Descriptions of fifteen new species of shells of the family Pleurotomidae. Proceedings of the Zoological Society of London 1893: 487–492
 Hedley, C. 1922. A revision of the Australian Turridae. Records of the Australian Museum 13(6): 213–359, pls 42–56
 Dautzenberg, P. (1923). Liste préliminaire des mollusques marins de Madagascar et description de deux espèces nouvelles. Journal de Conchyliologie 68: 21-74
 Dautzenberg, Ph. (1929). Mollusques testacés marins de Madagascar. Faune des Colonies Francaises, Tome III
 Powell, A.W.B. 1966. The molluscan families Speightiidae and Turridae, an evaluation of the valid taxa, both Recent and fossil, with list of characteristic species. Bulletin of the Auckland Institute and Museum. Auckland, New Zealand 5: 1–184, pls 1–23
 Kilburn, R.N. (1977) Taxonomic studies on the marine Mollusca of southern Africa and Mozambique. Part 1. Annals of the Natal Museum, 23, 173–214
 Cernohorsky, W.O. 1978. Tropical Pacific marine shells. Sydney : Pacific Publications 352 pp., 68 pls
 Wells, F.F., Bryce, C.W., Clark, J.E. & Hansen, G.M. 1990. Christmas Shells. The marine molluscs of Christmas Island (Indian Ocean). Christmas Island: Australia : Christmas Island Natural History Association 98 pp., pls 1-81.

External links
 Hinds R. B. (1843). On new species of Pleurotoma, Clavatula, and Mangelia. Proceedings of the Zoological Society of London. 11: 36-46
 
 Tröndlé, J. E. A. N., and Michel Boutet. "Inventory of marine molluscs of French Polynesia." Atoll Research Bulletin (2009)
 

tessellata
Gastropods described in 1843